Omorfokklisia (before 1926: Γκάλιστα - Gkalista) is a village in Kastoria Regional Unit, Macedonia, Greece.

The Greek census (1920) recorded 596 people in the village and in 1923 there were 400 inhabitants (or 40 families) who were Muslim. Following the Greek-Turkish population exchange, in 1926 within Gkalista there were 45 refugee families from Pontus. The Greek census (1928) recorded 406 village inhabitants. There were 32 refugee families (118 people) in 1928. After the population exchange, the village mosque and the water fountain next to it were destroyed.

References

Populated places in Kastoria (regional unit)